Ōkiwi Bay is a small town in the Marlborough Sounds, New Zealand, within Croisilles Harbour. It has about 200 houses and about 80 permanent residents. The area was noted for its oysters.

Name
Ōkiwi Bay officially had a macron added to its name on 5 November 2018 by the New Zealand Geographic Board. The New Zealand Ministry for Culture and Heritage gives a translation of "place of the kiwi" for Ōkiwi.

About
There were pre-European Maori settlements in this area and the Bay's name dates from those times. The primary Ngāti Koata settlement in the area was at Whangarae, adjacent to Okiwi Bay on the western side of Goat Hill.  In 1880 50 acres was leased by the Crown to Alabby Hobbs. A saw mill was opened in the 1890s by Messrs Mace and Holland who had lease 3,200 acres of Maori land. A track to the Rai Valley was made in 1895. By 1904 Okiwi Bay had become a popular destination for holiday makers,

In 1957 a unique patu was uncovered while excavating a load of single from a beach in Okiwi Bay. The patu was described as being stone and resembling a medieval mace. The style was more in line with those from the Chatham Islands, but the stone was definitely of local, Okiwi Bay, origin.

It is a base for the Okiwi Bay Voluntary Rural Fire Force and St John's Ambulance. There is a holiday park and the area is predominantly a holiday resort. In 2015 when a Dutch aquaculture company, Skretting, proposed setting up a fish farm in the Bay, local residents protested against it, stating that it would ruin the natural resources of the area. The Environment Court granted permission for Skretting's to proceed in 2016. In 2017 the settlement got mobile phone coverage.

Demographics

Ōkiwi Bay had a population of 63 at the 2018 New Zealand census, a decrease of 18 people (-22.2%) since the 2013 census, and a decrease of 36 people (-36.4%) since the 2006 census. There were 36 households. There were 30 males and 33 females, giving a sex ratio of 0.91 males per female. The median age was 66 years (compared with 37.4 years nationally), with few or no people aged under 15 years, 3 (4.8%) aged 15 to 29, 27 (42.9%) aged 30 to 64, and 36 (57.1%) aged 65 or older.

Ethnicities were 95.2% European/Pākehā, and 4.8% Māori.

Although some people objected to giving their religion, 52.4% had no religion, and 33.3% were Christian.

Of those at least 15 years old, none had a bachelor or higher degree, and 27 (42.9%) people had no formal qualifications. The median income was $21,000, compared with $31,800 nationally. The employment status of those at least 15 was that 15 (23.8%) people were employed full-time, 12 (19.0%) were part-time, and 3 (4.8%) were unemployed.

References

Populated places in the Marlborough Region
Marlborough Sounds
Populated places in the Marlborough Sounds